In computing, a memory address is a reference to a specific memory location used at various levels by software and hardware. Memory addresses are fixed-length sequences of digits conventionally displayed and manipulated as unsigned integers. Such numerical semantic bases itself upon features of CPU (such as the instruction pointer and incremental address registers), as well upon use of the memory like an array endorsed by various programming languages.

Types

Physical addresses
A digital computer's main memory consists of many memory locations. Each memory location has a physical address which is a code. The CPU (or other device) can use the code to access the corresponding memory location. Generally only system software, i.e. the BIOS, operating systems, and some specialized utility programs (e.g., memory testers), address physical memory using machine code operands or processor registers, instructing the CPU to direct a hardware device, called the memory controller, to use the memory bus or system bus, or separate control, address and data busses, to execute the program's commands.   The memory controllers' bus consists of a number of parallel lines, each represented by a binary digit (bit).  The width of the bus, and thus the number of addressable storage units, and the number of bits in each unit, varies among computers.

Logical addresses
A computer program uses memory addresses to execute machine code, and to store and retrieve data.  In early computers logical and physical addresses corresponded, but since the introduction of virtual memory most application programs do not have a knowledge of physical addresses.  Rather, they address logical addresses, or virtual addresses, using the computer's memory management unit and operating system memory mapping; see below.

Unit of address resolution

Most modern computers are byte-addressable. Each address identifies a single byte (eight bits) of storage. Data larger than a single byte may be stored in a sequence of consecutive addresses.  There exist word-addressable computers, where the minimal addressable storage unit is exactly the processor's word. For example, the Data General Nova minicomputer, and the Texas Instruments TMS9900 and National Semiconductor IMP-16 microcomputers used 16 bit words, and there were many 36-bit mainframe computers (e.g., PDP-10) which used 18-bit word addressing, not byte addressing, giving an address space of 218 36-bit words, approximately 1 megabyte of storage.  The efficiency of addressing of memory depends on the bit size of the bus used for addresses – the more bits used, the more addresses are available to the computer.  For example, an 8-bit-byte-addressable machine with a 20-bit address bus (e.g. Intel 8086) can address 220 (1,048,576) memory locations, or one MiB of memory, while a 32-bit bus (e.g. Intel 80386) addresses 232 (4,294,967,296) locations, or a 4 GiB address space.  In contrast, a 36-bit word-addressable machine with an 18-bit address bus addresses only 218 (262,144) 36-bit locations (9,437,184 bits), equivalent to 1,179,648 8-bit bytes, or 1152 KiB, or 1.125 MiB — slightly more than the 8086.

Some older computers (decimal computers), were decimal digit-addressable.  For example, each address in the IBM 1620's magnetic-core memory identified a single six bit binary-coded decimal digit, consisting of a parity bit, flag bit and four numerical bits.  The 1620 used 5-digit decimal addresses, so in theory the highest possible address was 99,999.  In practice, the CPU supported 20,000 memory locations, and up to two optional external memory units could be added, each supporting 20,000 addresses, for a total of 60,000 (00000–59999).

Word size versus address size
Word size is a characteristic of computer architecture denoting the number of bits that a CPU can process at one time. Modern processors, including embedded systems, usually have a word size of 8, 16, 24, 32 or 64 bits; most current general-purpose computers use 32 or 64 bits. Many different sizes have been used historically, including 8, 9, 10, 12, 18, 24, 36, 39, 40, 48 and 60 bits.

Very often, when referring to the word size of a modern computer, one is also describing the size of address space on that computer. For instance, a computer said to be "32-bit" also usually allows 32-bit memory addresses; a byte-addressable 32-bit computer can address 232 = 4,294,967,296 bytes of memory, or 4 gibibytes (GiB). This allows one memory address to be efficiently stored in one word.

However, this does not always hold true. Computers can have memory addresses larger or smaller than their word size. For instance, many 8-bit processors, such as the MOS Technology 6502, supported 16-bit addresses— if not, they would have been limited to a mere 256 bytes of memory addressing. The 16-bit Intel 8088 and Intel 8086 supported 20-bit addressing via segmentation, allowing them to access 1 MiB rather than 64 KiB of memory. All Intel Pentium processors since the Pentium Pro include Physical Address Extensions (PAE) which support mapping 36-bit physical addresses to 32-bit virtual addresses. Many early processors held  2 addresses per word  , such as 36-bit processors.

In theory, modern byte-addressable 64-bit computers can address 264 bytes (16 exbibytes), but in practice the amount of memory is limited by the CPU, the memory controller, or the printed circuit board design (e.g., number of physical memory connectors or amount of soldered-on memory).

Contents of each memory location

Each memory location in a stored-program computer holds a binary number or decimal number of some sort.  Its interpretation, as data of some data type or as an instruction, and use are determined by the instructions which retrieve and manipulate it.

Some early programmers combined instructions and data in words as a way to save memory, when it was expensive: The Manchester Mark 1 had space in its 40-bit words to store little bits of data – its processor ignored a small section in the middle of a word – and that was often exploited as extra data storage. Self-replicating programs such as viruses treat themselves sometimes as data and sometimes as instructions. Self-modifying code is generally deprecated nowadays, as it makes testing and maintenance disproportionally difficult to the saving of a few bytes, and can also give incorrect results because of the compiler or processor's assumptions about the machine's state, but is still sometimes used deliberately, with great care.

Address space in application programming
In modern multitasking environment, an application process usually has in its address space (or spaces) chunks of memory of following types:
 Machine code, including:
 program's own code (historically known as code segment or text segment);
 shared libraries.
 Data, including:
 initialized data (data segment);
 uninitialized (but allocated) variables;
 run-time stack;
 heap;
 shared memory and memory mapped files.
Some parts of address space may be not mapped at all.

Some systems have a "split" memory architecture where machine code, constants, and data are in different locations, and may have different address sizes.
For example, PIC18 microcontrollers have a 21-bit program counter to address machine code and constants in Flash memory, and 12-bit address registers to address data in SRAM.

Addressing schemes

But a program can also use relative address which specifies a location in relation to somewhere else (the base address). There are many more indirect addressing modes.

Mapping logical addresses to physical and virtual memory also adds several levels of indirection; see below.

Memory models
Many programmers prefer to address memory such that there is no distinction between code space and data space (see above), as well as from physical and virtual memory (see above) — in other words, numerically identical pointers refer to exactly the same byte of RAM.

However, many early computers did not support such a flat memory model — in particular, Harvard architecture machines force program storage to be completely separate from data storage.
Many modern DSPs (such as the Motorola 56000) have three separate storage areas — program storage, coefficient storage, and data storage. Some commonly used instructions fetch from all three areas simultaneously — fewer storage areas (even if there were the same total bytes of storage) would make those instructions run slower.

Memory models in x86 architecture

Early x86 processors use the segmented memory model addresses based on a combination of two numbers: a memory segment, and an offset within that segment.

Some segments are implicitly treated as code segments, dedicated for instructions, stack segments, or normal data segments. Although the usages are different, the segments do not have different memory protections reflecting this.
In the flat memory model all segments (segment registers) are generally set to zero, and only offsets are variable.

See also
Base address
Endianness
Low-level programming language

Memory address register

Memory allocation
Memory management unit (MMU)
Memory model (programming)
Memory protection
Memory segmentation
Offset (computer science), also known as a displacement
Page table

References

Computer memory